Khoshabar Rural District is a rural district (dehestan) in the Central District of Rezvanshahr County, Gilan Province, Iran. At the 2006 census, its population was 13,354, in 3,351 families. The rural district has 39 villages.

References 

Rural Districts of Gilan Province
Rezvanshahr County